Vincent Fang is the name of:

Vincent Fang (lyricist), Taiwanese lyricist
Vincent Fang (entrepreneur), Hong Kong entrepreneur and member of the Legislative Council